GrapheneOS (formerly Android Hardening or AndroidHardening) is an Android-based, open source, privacy and security-focused mobile operating system for selected Google Pixel smartphones.

History 

The main developer, Daniel Micay, originally worked on CopperheadOS, until a schism over software licensing between the co-founders of Copperhead Limited led to Micay's dismissal from the company in 2018. After the incident, Micay continued working on the Android Hardening project, which was renamed as GrapheneOS and announced in April 2019.

According to Damien Wilde of 9to5Google, GrapheneOS released Android 12L for Pixels before Google did, second to ProtonAOSP. GrapheneOS apps "Secure Camera" and "Secure PDF Viewer" (based on pdf.js) were released to the Google Play Store and GitHub.

Features 
As of March 2022, GrapheneOS only officially supports Pixel devices. By default Google apps are not installed with GrapheneOS, but users can install a sandboxed version of Google Services from the 'Apps' app, which is installed with GrapheneOS. The sandboxed Google services should allow access to the Google Play Store and apps dependent on Google Services, along with features including push notifications and in-app payments.

GrapheneOS has developed a hardened Chromium-based web browser and WebView implementation known as Vanadium.

GrapheneOS introduces revocable network access and sensors permission toggles for each installed app. GrapheneOS also randomizes MAC address per-connection by default, and includes a PIN scrambling option for the lock screen. A hardware-based attestation app known as Auditor is also included.

Reception 
In 2019, Georg Pichler of Der Standard, and other news sources, quoted Edward Snowden saying on Twitter, "If I were configuring a smartphone today, I'd use Daniel Micay's GrapheneOS as the base operating system." In discussing why services should not force users to install proprietary apps, Lennart Mühlenmeier of netzpolitik.org suggested GrapheneOS as an alternative to Apple or Google. Svět Mobilně and Webtekno repeated the suggestions that GrapheneOS is a good security- and privacy-oriented replacement for standard Android. In a detailed review of GrapheneOS for Golem.de, Moritz Tremmel and Sebastian Grüner said they were able to use GrapheneOS similarly to other Android, but enjoying more freedom from Google, without noticing differences from "additional memory protection, but that's the way it should be." They concluded GrapheneOS cannot change how "Android devices become garbage after three years at the latest", but "it can better secure the devices during their remaining life while protecting privacy."

In June 2021, reviews of GrapheneOS, KaiOS, AliOS, and Tizen OS, were published in Cellular News. The review of GrapheneOS called it "arguably the best mobile operating system in terms of privacy and security." However, they criticized GrapheneOS for its inconvenience to users, saying "GrapheneOS is completely de-Googled and will stay that way forever—at least according to the developers." They also noticed a "slight performance decrease" and said "it might take two full seconds for an app—even if it’s just the Settings app—to fully load."

In March 2022, writing for How-To Geek Joe Fedewa said, unlike standard versions of Android, Google apps were not included due to concerns over privacy, and GrapheneOS also did not include a default app store. Instead, Fedewa suggested, F-Droid could be used. In a review of GrapheneOS installed on a Pixel 3, after a week of use, Jonathan Lamont of MobileSyrup opined GrapheneOS demonstrated Android's reliance on Google. He called GrapheneOS install process "straightforward" and concluded to like GrapheneOS overall, but criticized the post-install as "often not a seamless experience like using an unmodified Pixel or an iPhone", attributing his experience to his "over-reliance on Google apps" and the absence of some "smart" features in GrapheneOS default keyboard and camera apps, in comparison to software from Google. In his initial impressions post a week prior, Lamont said after an easy install there were issues with permissions for Google's Messages app, and difficulty importing contacts; Lamont then concluded, "Anyone looking for a straightforward experience may want to avoid GrapheneOS or other privacy-oriented Android experiences since the privacy gains often come at the expense of convenience and ease of use."  In July 2022, Charlie Osborne of ZDNet suggested that individuals who suspect a Pegasus infection use a secondary device with GrapheneOS for secure communication.

See also 
 Comparison of mobile operating systems
 List of custom Android distributions
 Security-focused operating system

References

External links 
 

Android (operating system) software
ARM operating systems
Computing platforms
Custom Android firmware
Embedded Linux distributions
Linux distributions
Linux distributions without systemd
Mobile Linux
Mobile software
Operating system families
Operating systems
Software using the Apache license